William Peter Charles Williams (born 1959) is a show director, stage & lighting designer and video director for concerts, theatre, and multimedia projects.  He is best known for his groundbreaking work with the rock band U2, and is recognised as one of the leading artists in this field.  William Gibson, writing in Wired magazine, said “Willie Williams combines a passionate delight in technology with an infectious low-tech joy.  His innovations have become industry standards.” 

He was born in 1959 in Newcastle-upon-Tyne and raised in Sheffield, England, son of Robert Woodman Williams, a singer & medical practitioner who was an early pioneer in the then fledgling field of physiotherapy and who also sang with South Yorkshire Opera.  Williams excelled at mathematics and science in school and planned to study physics at University College, London.  The advent of punk rock caused him to enter the music scene instead, and he began doing lights for various bands such as Writz, Deaf School and Stiff Little Fingers.

Willie Williams has been responsible for the design of U2's tours from 1982 onward, most famously the extravagant, bewildering Zoo TV Tour (1992–93), and most recently the Innocence + Experience Tour (2015), the Joshua Tree Tours 2017 and 2019, and the Experience + Innocence Tour (2018). He has also worked with musical artists such as R.E.M., David Bowie, The Rolling Stones, Robbie Williams, Darren Hayes, George Michael and Self Esteem.

Williams has designed for the Montreal-based dance company La La La Human Steps.  Other collaborations have been with Laurie Anderson, Marianne Faithfull and the Kronos Quartet, most notably on Sun Rings, a joint effort with NASA that combines the string quartet's music with video and audio material collected by the Voyager 1 and Voyager 2 spacecraft.

Gallery and architectural installations
In 2015, Williams designed the giant kinetic chandelier installed at Omnia nightclub at Caesars Palace in Las Vegas.   He has exhibited his own kinetic light sculptures in several art galleries. The sculptures, entitled "Lumia Domestica", create kaleidoscopic projections in the tradition of Nicolas Schöffer and Thomas Wilfred by refracting light through household glassware.  Other public works include the creation of lighting installations at London's Southbank Centre and within Canterbury Cathedral; "SkyChurch", a multimedia performance space at the Experience Music Project in Seattle, Washington, and a permanent exhibit at Cleveland's Rock and Roll Hall of Fame Museum.

Theatre works
Theatre shows Williams has worked on include Prima Facie, starring Jodie Comer, at the Harold Pinter Theatre, London, We Will Rock You, Little Britain Live, French and Saunders Still Alive, Steve Coogan is Alan Partridge and Other Less Successful Characters, The Fast Show Live, Barbarella and Pam Ann.

Awards
1987 Lighting Director of the Year, Performance Magazine, United States
1992 Lighting Designer of the Year, Performance Magazine, United States
1992 Lighting Designer of the Year, Lighting Dimensions International, United States
2000 Top 25 Visionaries in Entertainment, Wired Magazine, United States
2001 Eddy Award for Excellence in Design, New York
2002 Lighting Designer of the Year, Live Magazine Awards, London
2003 Lighting Designer of the Year, Total Production Awards, London
2006 Lighting Designer of the Year, Total Production Awards, London
2006 Metropolitan Home, Design 100
2007 Best in Book, Creative Review Annual (George Michael, 25 Live Tour)
2008 Excellence in Design Award (George Michael, 25 Live Tour), Live Design, New York
2009 Redden Award for Excellence in Design, United States
2010 Live Production of the Year (U2360), Lighting Designer of the Year and Video Visionary, Total Production Awards, London
2016 Most Creative Stage Production (U2 Innocence and Experience Tour), Pollstar Concert Industry Awards
2019 Honorary Fellowship, Rose Bruford College of Theatre & Performance

References

External links
 
 Treatment Studio, London
 Rolling Stone Interview

1959 births
Living people
Artists from Sheffield
British scenic designers
Lighting designers
British music video directors
People educated at Silverdale School, Sheffield